The Widonids, also called Guidonids, or Lambertiner, after their leading names, were an Italian family of Frankish origin prominent in the ninth century. They were descended from Guy of Nantes, whose origins were Austrasian. They were an aggressive dynasty, expanding their base of power into the Papal States, ever loyal to the Empire and never the Papacy. They were related to the Carolingians in the female line and one even made a claim to the throne of France on that basis. The Widonids and the Rorgonids competed for control of the Breton March through much of the ninth century.

The first member of the family to attain prominence was Lambert's son Guy I, who was made duke of Spoleto by the Emperor Lothair I in 842. He was active in Lotharingia and Italy, even marrying a local Lombard woman, Itta (or Itana), the daughter of Sico of Benevento. His descendants continued to rule Spoleto until 897.

The most famous Guidoni were Guy III and his son Lambert II. Both became kings of Italy and emperors. Guy IV of Spoleto also became Duke of Benevento. One member, Fulk the Venerable, was even archbishop of Rheims, assisting Guy III in making a claim on the French crown.

Explanatory notes

References

Citations

Sources 
 Cited sources
 Barton, Richard E., Lordship in the County of Maine, c. 890-1160, Boydell Press, 2004 (available on Google Books)

 General sources
 Caravale, Mario (ed.). Dizionario Biografico degli Italiani: LXI Guglielmo Gonzaga – Jacobini. Rome, 2003.
 Caravale, Mario (ed.). Dizionario Biografico degli Italiani: LXIII Labroca – Laterza. Rome, 2004.
 Wickham, Chris. Early Medieval Italy: Central Power and Local Society 400–1000. MacMillan Press: 1981. 

Guideschi dynasty